Blow Your Speakers may refer to:

 "Blow Your Speakers", a 1986 song by Manowar from Fighting the World
 "Blow Your Speakers", a 2011 song by Big Time Rush from Elevate